Harold James "Héctor" Henman (5 January 1879 – 26 May 1969) was a footballer who played as an inside left for South Africa and Argentina.

Early life
Henman was born in Oxford, England, on 5 January 1879, and educated at Bedford School from 1893 to 1897. At an early age he moved to South Africa.

He received the temporary rank of lieutenant in the Army on 16 January 1902, upon joining the 34th Battalion, Imperial Yeomanry, during the later stages of the Second Boer War in South Africa.

Playing career

Club
In Argentina Henman played for Alumni Athletic Club.

International
Henman played one match for an unofficial South African XI in 1904.

In 1906 Henman was selected to play for a South Africa national team that toured South America. Upon arriving in Argentina Henman decided to stay and played one match for the Argentina national team.

Later life
Henman died suddenly at his home in Los Cocos, Córdoba Province, Argentina, on 26 May 1969.

References

1879 births
1969 deaths
People educated at Bedford School
Argentine footballers
English footballers
Association football forwards
Argentina international footballers
South African soccer players
Argentine people of English descent
Alumni Athletic Club players
South Africa international soccer players
British Army personnel of the Second Boer War
Imperial Yeomanry officers
Dual internationalists (football)
English emigrants to Argentina
English expatriate sportspeople in South Africa
Footballers from Oxford